The Khuzestan Plain is the relatively flat region of Iran where the Khuzestan province and the cities of Ahvaz, Susa and Abadan are located. It is the largest plain in Iran and one of the richest agricultural areas in the world. It is irrigated by several big rivers such as Karun and Karkheh. Khuzestan Plain borders Mesopotamia and is separated from it by the Shatt al-Arab (known as Arvand Rud in Iran) river.

Khuzestan was the center of the ancient Elamite culture of Iran.

Wildlife

In the 19th and early 20th centuries, the Asiatic lion was recorded in Fars Province, Ramhormoz County, Shushtar County, Dezful County and along the Karun river.

See also
 Tidal irrigation

References

Landforms of Khuzestan Province
Plains of Iran